Black Meadow (now known as "Wolftrap Farm") is a historic plantation house and farm complex located near Gordonsville, Orange County, Virginia. The house was built in 1856, and is a -story, three-bay, Greek Revival style dwelling with a front gable roof. It was renovated in 1916, with the addition of a two-story wood-frame ell and realignment of interior spaces.  Also on the property are the contributing milk house (c. 1916), slave quarters (c. 1856), a dairy barn (c. 1943), a bent barn/stable (c. 1856), a multiuse barn/shed (c. 1856), and a tenant house (c. 1943).

Black Meadow was one of the outlying farms owned and cultivated by James and Dolley Madison, whose Montpelier home lies just a few miles northwest.

It was listed on the National Register of Historic Places in 2005.

The farm, known since the mid-1970s as Wolftrap Farm, is now operated as a wedding and events venue and seven homes on the farm are available as vacation rentals.

References

Plantation houses in Virginia
Houses on the National Register of Historic Places in Virginia
Farms on the National Register of Historic Places in Virginia
Greek Revival houses in Virginia
Colonial Revival architecture in Virginia
Houses completed in 1856
Houses in Orange County, Virginia
National Register of Historic Places in Orange County, Virginia
Slave cabins and quarters in the United States